Henriette Ragon (10 June 1918 – 30 April 2015), better known as Patachou, was a French singer and actress. She was an Officier of the Légion d'honneur.

Biography

Early life
Born in the 12th arrondissement of Paris, Henriette Ragon began her working life as a typist, then a factory worker, a shoeseller and an antique dealer.

Patachou
In 1948, with her husband Jean Billon she took over a cabaret-restaurant in Montmartre, called Patachou. (Their son Pierre Billon had some success as a singer in the 1970s and wrote J'ai oublié de vivre  for Johnny Hallyday.) She began to sing in the bistro, and journalists began to call her Patachou after the name of her cabaret (pâte-à-choux means cream puff dough). Georges Brassens sang there, and together they sang the duet "Maman, papa". She was the first to interpret other songs he composed such as "Le bricoleur", "La chasse aux papillons", etc.

The evening she sang them for the first time, she suggested her audience stay to the end of the show and meet the writer of these songs, and Brassens went up on to the Patachou stage for the first time and sang  Le Gorille and P..de toi. Sometimes she would collect half-ties (she would snip the neckties of customers reluctant to join in the singing and immediately staple them to the ceiling, a habit which has created a very original decor of the place - hundreds of neckties hanging above) – Thomas Dewey and Errol Flynn were among her victims.

First recordings
Her first records were released in 1952. She appeared at the Bobino, a Montparnasse music-hall, toured in France and then further afield. From 1953 onwards, she could be seen on-stage at the Palladium, the Waldorf Astoria, and Carnegie Hall, and throughout the United States.
From the beginning of the 1970s she toured Japan and Sweden where 'L'eternal Parigot', with her cheeky Parisian register, was popular.

Awards
Patachou was made Officier of the Légion d'honneur on 1 January 2009

Death
Patachou died on 30 April 2015 at the age of 96.

Filmography
1952: Jouons le jeu - la chanteuse (segments 'L'avarice' and 'La fidélité')
1953: Women of Paris (by Jean Boyer, Patachou sings "Brave Margot" by Georges Brassens) - Herself - Chanteuse
1955: Napoléon - Madame Sans-Gêne
1955: French Cancan (1955) - Yvette Guilbert
1983: Le disparu du 7 octobre (TV Movie, by Jacques Ertaud) - Blanche Auroux
1986: Faubourg St Martin - Madame Coppercage
1987: la Rumba (by Roger Hanin) - Madame Meyrals
1990: Le champignon des Carpathes - Madame Ambrogiano
1990: Les matins chagrins - Alice
1990: Night of the Fox (TV Movie)
1992: Chasse gardée - Madame Cygne
1993:  (by Pierre Salvadori) - Madame Meynard
1993: Les Grandes Marées (TV Mini-Series, by Jean Sagols) - Sophie Leclerc
1999: Pola X (by Leos Carax) - Marguerite
2000: Drôle de Félix (by Olivier Ducastel and Jacques Martineau) - Mathilde, Grandmother
2000: Les Acteurs (by Bertrand Blier) - Blind old lady
2001: Belphégor, le fantôme du Louvre (by Jean-Paul Salomé) - Geneviève
2004: San-Antonio (by Frédéric Auburtin) - Ruth Booz

References

1918 births
2015 deaths
Musicians from Paris
French film actresses
Officiers of the Légion d'honneur
Audio Fidelity Records artists
20th-century French women singers